James Patrick Johnson (born February 20, 1987) is an American professional basketball player for the Indiana Pacers of the National Basketball Association (NBA). He was the starting power forward for the Wake Forest Demon Deacons from 2007 to 2009. He was drafted 16th overall in the 2009 NBA draft by the Chicago Bulls.

High school career
Johnson attended Cheyenne East High School in Cheyenne, Wyoming. During his senior year, he averaged 28 points and nine rebounds per game.

Considered a four-star recruit by Rivals.com, Johnson was listed as the No. 16 small forward and the No. 62 player in the nation in 2007.

College career
As a freshman at Wake Forest in 2007–08, Johnson had an instant impact, garnering third-team All-ACC honors as a freshman and finishing second in the 2008 ACC Rookie of the Year balloting, as he led the Demon Deacons in scoring and rebounding.

As a sophomore, Johnson again led the team in rebounding, leading the team to a 24–5 record and a #1 ranking during the 2008–09 season. He was again named third team All-ACC. Following the season, Johnson declared his eligibility for the 2009 NBA draft.

Professional career

Chicago Bulls (2009–2011)
Johnson was drafted 16th overall by the Chicago Bulls in the 2009 NBA draft. On July 8, 2009, he signed his first professional contract with the Bulls. On January 27, 2011, Johnson was assigned to the Iowa Energy of the NBA D-League. On February 14, 2011, he was recalled by the Bulls.

Toronto Raptors (2011–2012)
On February 22, 2011, Johnson was traded to the Toronto Raptors in exchange for the 2011 first round pick that they had acquired from the Miami Heat.

Sacramento Kings (2012–2013)
On July 16, 2012, Johnson was traded to the Sacramento Kings in exchange for a 2014 second-round draft pick. On December 28, 2012, Johnson hit a game-winning 3-pointer at the buzzer which gave the Kings a 106–105 victory over the New York Knicks.

Rio Grande Valley Vipers (2013)
On September 30, 2013, Johnson signed with the Atlanta Hawks. He was waived on October 21.

In November 2013, Johnson was acquired by the Rio Grande Valley Vipers. In 10 games with the Vipers, he averaged 18.5 points, 9.1 rebounds, 4.8 assists, 1.9 steals and 3.4 blocks per game.

Memphis Grizzlies (2013–2014)
On December 16, 2013, Johnson signed with the Memphis Grizzlies.

Return to Toronto (2014–2016)
On July 17, 2014, Johnson signed with the Toronto Raptors, returning for a second stint.

On December 19, 2014, in Detroit, after Johnson's dunk on Andre Drummond made it 95–75 midway through the fourth, on Toronto's next possession, Drummond smashed into Johnson with a forearm and hip smash. This set off a melee that saw Drummond get a flagrant foul and four technicals called. Following the game, Johnson said "That was nasty, but that's basketball. I don't expect anything less from anybody that's trying to win. Frustration sets in when you want to win – no hard feelings." When asked to comment on the dunk itself, Johnson remarked, "That was nasty, right? I cocked that joint back and banged on him!" Johnson's quote, combined with the dunk, garnered social media buzz by Raptor fans, gaining popularity as a catchphrase associated with him to the point that it once spawned online T-shirt sales featuring his quote printed on T-shirts by an entrepreneur for a charitable campaign.

On February 21, 2015, Johnson scored a career-high 27 points in a 76–98 loss to the Houston Rockets.

Miami Heat (2016–2020)
On July 10, 2016, Johnson signed a one-year, $4 million contract with the Miami Heat. He made his debut for the Heat in their season opener on October 26, 2016, recording 11 points and six assists off the bench in a 108–96 win over Orlando Magic. On February 10, 2017, he scored a season-high 26 points in a 108–99 win over the Brooklyn Nets, helping the Heat record their 13th straight win. On April 5, 2017, he went 6 of 7 from three-point range and had 26 points in a 112–99 win over the Charlotte Hornets.

On July 7, 2017, Johnson re-signed with the Heat on a 4-year, $60 million contract. On January 10, 2018, he was suspended for one game without pay for an altercation with Serge Ibaka during a game against the Toronto Raptors a day earlier. On March 19, 2018, he scored a career-high 31 points in a 149–141 double-overtime win over the Denver Nuggets.

Johnson missed the first month of the 2018–19 season following off-season sports hernia surgery.

Minnesota Timberwolves (2020)
On February 6, 2020, Johnson was traded to the Minnesota Timberwolves in a 3-team trade.

Dallas Mavericks (2020–2021)
On November 20, 2020, Johnson was traded, alongside the draft rights to Aleksej Pokuševski and Minnesota's 2024 second-round pick, to the Oklahoma City Thunder in exchange for Ricky Rubio and the draft rights to Jaden McDaniels and Immanuel Quickley. On November 27, Johnson was traded to the Dallas Mavericks in a three-team trade involving the Detroit Pistons.

New Orleans Pelicans (2021)
On March 26, 2021, Johnson was traded, alongside Wes Iwundu and a second-round draft-pick, to the New Orleans Pelicans in exchange for JJ Redick and Nicolò Melli.

Brooklyn Nets (2021–2022)
On August 6, 2021, Johnson signed a one-year contract with the Brooklyn Nets. On March 1, 2022, he logged a season-high 19 points, alongside three assists, in a 108–109 loss to the Toronto Raptors. On April 7, Johnson was waived by the Nets.

Indiana Pacers (2022–present) 

On September 16, 2022, Johnson signed with the Indiana Pacers. On February 9, 2023, he was waived by the Pacers. On February 13, Johnson re-signed with the Pacers for the remainder of the season.

Career statistics

NBA

Regular season

|-
| style="text-align:left;"| 
| style="text-align:left;"| Chicago
| 65 || 11 || 11.6 || .452 || .326 || .729 || 2.0 || .7 || .3 || .7 || 3.9
|-
| style="text-align:left;"| 
| style="text-align:left;"| Chicago
| 13 || 0 || 9.5 || .415 || .222 || .462 || 1.8 || 1.1 || .6 || .7 || 3.2
|-
| style="text-align:left;"|
| style="text-align:left;"| Toronto
| 25 || 25 || 28.0 || .464 || .240 || .707 || 4.7 || 3.0 || 1.0 || 1.1 || 9.2
|-
| style="text-align:left;"| 
| style="text-align:left;"| Toronto
| 62 || 40 || 25.2 || .450 || .317 || .704 || 4.7 || 2.0 || 1.1 || 1.4 || 9.1
|-
| style="text-align:left;"| 
| style="text-align:left;"| Sacramento
| 54 || 11 || 16.3 || .413 || .095 || .597 || 2.7 || 1.1 || .8 || .9 || 5.1
|-
| style="text-align:left;"| 
| style="text-align:left;"| Memphis
| 52 || 4 || 18.4 || .464 || .253 || .844 || 3.2 || 2.1 || .8 || 1.1 || 7.4
|-
| style="text-align:left;"| 
| style="text-align:left;"| Toronto
| 70 || 17 || 19.6 || .589 || .216 || .657 || 3.7 || 1.4 || .8 || 1.0 || 7.9
|-
| style="text-align:left;"| 
| style="text-align:left;"| Toronto
| 57 || 32 || 16.2 || .475 || .303 || .574 || 2.2 || 1.2 || .5 || .6 || 5.0
|-
| style="text-align:left;"| 
| style="text-align:left;"| Miami
| 76 || 5 || 27.4 || .479 || .341 || .707 || 4.9 || 3.6 || 1.0 || 1.1 || 12.8
|-
| style="text-align:left;"| 
| style="text-align:left;"| Miami
| 73 || 41 || 26.6 || .503 || .308 || .698 || 4.9 || 3.8 || 1.0 || .7 || 10.8
|-
| style="text-align:left;"| 
| style="text-align:left;"| Miami
| 55 || 33 || 21.2 || .433 || .336 || .714 || 3.2 || 2.5 || .6 || .5 || 7.8
|-
| style="text-align:left;"| 
| style="text-align:left;"| Miami
| 18 || 0 || 15.6 || .448 || .356 || .571 || 2.9 || 1.2 || .3 || .7 || 5.7
|-
| style="text-align:left;"| 
| style="text-align:left;"| Minnesota
| 14 || 1 || 24.1 || .500 || .370 || .676 || 4.7 || 3.8 || 1.4 || 1.4 || 12.0
|-
| style="text-align:left;"| 
| style="text-align:left;"| Dallas
| 29 || 1 || 17.4 || .462 || .250 || .586 || 3.0 || 1.7 || .8 || .8 || 5.7
|-
| style="text-align:left;"| 
| style="text-align:left;"| New Orleans
| 22 || 11 || 24.5 || .434 || .267 || .596 || 4.1 || 2.2 || .8 || .9 || 9.2
|-
| style="text-align:left;"| 
| style="text-align:left;"| Brooklyn
| 62 || 10 || 19.2 || .469 || .271 || .527 || 3.5 || 2.1 || .5 || .5 || 5.5
|-
| style="text-align:left;"| 
| style="text-align:left;"| Indiana
| 12 || 1 || 8.2 || .370 || .300 || .750 || 1.3 || .6 || .3 || .4 || 2.2
|- class="sortbottom"
| style="text-align:center;" colspan="2"| Career
| 759 || 243 || 20.3 || .474 || .302 || .679 || 3.5 || 2.1 || .8 || .9 || 7.6

Playoffs

|-
| style="text-align:left;"| 2010
| style="text-align:left;"| Chicago
| 4 || 0 || 5.0 || .000 || .000 || – || .3 || .3 || .0 || .0 || .0
|-
| style="text-align:left;"| 2014
| style="text-align:left;"| Memphis
| 3 || 0 || 9.3 || .333 || .400 || .700 || 2.0 || .0 || .3 || .0 || 6.3
|-
| style="text-align:left;"| 2015
| style="text-align:left;"| Toronto
| 2 || 0 || 6.0 || .333 || – || .000 || 1.0 || .5 || .0 || .0 || 2.0
|-
| style="text-align:left;"| 2016
| style="text-align:left;"| Toronto
| 10 || 0 || 9.8 || .480 || .444 || .667 || 1.5 || .6 || .3 || .0 || 3.0
|-
| style="text-align:left;"| 2018
| style="text-align:left;"| Miami
| 5 || 5 || 32.2 || .548 || .538 || .643 || 6.0 || 4.8 || 1.2 || 1.2 || 12.4
|- class="sortbottom"
| style="text-align:center;" colspan="2"| Career
| 24 || 5 || 13.3 || .467 || .464 || .545 || 2.3 || 1.3 || .4 || .3 || 4.8

College

|-
| style="text-align:left;"| 2007–08
| style="text-align:left;"| Wake Forest
| 30 || 28 || 29.2 || .487 || .280 || .689 || 8.1 || 1.2 || 1.4 || 1.3 || 14.6
|-
| style="text-align:left;"| 2008–09
| style="text-align:left;"| Wake Forest
| 31 || 31 || 30.5 || .542 || .319 || .697 || 8.5 || 2.0 || 1.4 || 1.5 || 15.0
|- class="sortbottom"
| style="text-align:center;" colspan="2"| Career
| 61 || 59 || 29.9 || .515 || .296 || .693 || 8.3 || 1.6 || 1.4 || 1.4 || 14.8

Personal life
Johnson is of African-American and Samoan heritage. He is a black belt in Karate and has a kickboxing record of 20–0 and has also fought in MMA.

Johnson has a tattoo of his son's name, "Naymin", inscribed around his front neck.

Johnson was arrested for domestic assault on June 7, 2014, after allegedly hitting and choking his wife, Callie, at their home. On June 30, 2014, the domestic assault case against Johnson was dismissed after his wife failed to appear in court. The couple later divorced, with Callie gaining custody of their son.

References

External links

Wake Forest Demon Deacons bio

1987 births
Living people
21st-century African-American sportspeople
African-American basketball players
American expatriate basketball people in Canada
American male karateka
American male kickboxers
American male mixed martial artists
Mixed martial artists utilizing karate
American men's basketball players
American sportspeople of Samoan descent
Basketball players from Wyoming
Brooklyn Nets players
Chicago Bulls draft picks
Chicago Bulls players
Dallas Mavericks players
Iowa Energy players
Memphis Grizzlies players
Miami Heat players
Minnesota Timberwolves players
New Orleans Pelicans players
Power forwards (basketball)
Rio Grande Valley Vipers players
Sacramento Kings players
Small forwards
Sportspeople from Cheyenne, Wyoming
Toronto Raptors players
Wake Forest Demon Deacons men's basketball players
20th-century African-American people